Gold Mind Records was the record label of guitarist Norman Harris, distributed via Salsoul Records.

Many of the early Gold Mind tracks were  amalgamated by DJ Walter Gibbons. These tracks date from the late 1970s; a couple of years later, Salsoul (with the help of Shep Pettibone) would revive some of the Gold Mind tracks like First Choice's "Doctor Love" and "Let No Man Put Asunder", and Loleatta Holloway's "Love Sensation" for the early 1980s dance jams auditions. These were opened on Salsoul and Larry Levan chose "Double Cross" and "The Greatest Performance Of My Life" for his Larry Levan's Greatest Mixes Volume Two.

"Love Thang" was Tee Scott's first ever mix.

Other notable songs from the Gold Mind catalogue include Holloway's "Dreaming", Love Committee's "Just As Long As I Got You", and "Hit and Run".

See also
 List of record labels

Defunct record labels of the United States
Vanity record labels